Novak Djokovic defeated Milos Raonic in the final, 1–6, 6–3, 6–4 to win the men's singles tennis title at the 2020 Cincinnati Masters. With the win, he claimed his record-equaling 35th Masters 1000 title (tying Rafael Nadal's tally), and completed the double career Golden Masters. Djokovic became the first new singles titlist on the ATP Tour since its suspension due to the COVID-19 pandemic in March 2020.

Daniil Medvedev was the defending champion, but lost in the quarterfinals to Roberto Bautista Agut.

Due to the COVID-19 pandemic, this edition of the tournament was held at the USTA Billie Jean King National Tennis Center shortly before the 2020 US Open to minimize travel risks.

Seeds
The top eight seeds receive a bye into the second round.

Draw

Finals

Top half

Section 1

Section 2

Bottom half

Section 3

Section 4

Qualifying

Seeds

Qualifiers

Qualifying draw

First qualifier

Second qualifier

Third qualifier

Fourth qualifier

Fifth qualifier

Sixth qualifier

Seventh qualifier

Eighth qualifier

Ninth qualifier

Tenth qualifier

Eleventh qualifier

Twelfth qualifier

References

Main draw
Qualifying draw

Men's Singles